In civil law jurisdictions, abuse of rights (also known as Prohibition of Chicane) is the exercise of a legal right only to cause annoyance, harm, or injury to another. The abuser is liable for the harm caused by their actions. Some examples of this are abuse of power, barratry, frivolous or vexatious litigation, a spite fence or house, forum shopping, abuse of process, malicious prosecution, tax avoidance (vs. anti-avoidance rules, step transaction doctrine, economic substance), etc. The principle is a creature of case law and was expanded from the neighborhood law doctrine of aemulatio vicini under the jus commune. This principle departs from the classical theory that “he who uses a right injures no one” (= neminem laedit qui suo iure utitur), instead embracing the maxim “a right ends where abuse begins” (= le droit cesse où l'abus commence).

Foundation 
The abuse of rights principle is laid out in German law by the so-called Schikaneverbot ‘ban on vexatiousness’ (BGB §226). It reads as follows:

Article 2 of the Einleitung to the Swiss Civil Code states: 

Articles 19, 20 and 21 of the Civil Code of the Philippines state that:

 Art. 19. “Every person must, in the exercise of his rights and in the performance of his duties, act with justice, give everyone his due and observe honesty and good faith.”
 Art. 20. “Every person who, contrary to law, wilfully or negligently causes damage to another, shall indemnify the latter for the same.”
 Art. 21. “Any person who wilfully causes loss or injury to another in manner that is contrary to morals, good customs or public policy shall compensate the latter for the damage.”

Conditions 
At least one of four conditions is required to invoke the doctrine:

the predominant motive for exercising the right is to cause harm
no serious or legitimate interest exists for judicial protection
the exercise of the right is contra bonos mores or violates good faith or elementary fairness (equity)
the right is exercised for a purpose other than its intended legal purpose.

The principle does not exist in common law jurisdictions.

In Scots law (which is mixed civil/common law jurisdiction), a much more limited doctrine known as aemulatio vicini serves the same purpose.

See also
 Good faith
 Malice (law)
 Bullying
 Hate speech
 Evasion (law)

References

Further reading

Michael Byers. “Abuse of Rights: An Old Principle, A New Age”, McGill Law Journal 47 (2002): 389–431.
 David Johnson. “Owners and Neighbours: From Rome to Scotland”, in The Civil Law Tradition in Scotland. Ed. by R Evans Jones. Edinburgh: The Stair Society, 1995.
 A. Kiss. “Abuse of Rights”, in Encyclopedia of Public International Law, vol. 1, ed. Rudolf Bernhardt. Amsterdam: North-Holland, 1992.
 Elspeth Reid. “The Doctrine of Abuse of Rights: Perspective from a Mixed Jurisdiction”, Electronic Journal of Comparative Law 8, no. 3 (October 2004), <https://web.archive.org/web/20170206201518/http://www.ejcl.org/>
  J E Scholtens. “Abuse of Rights”, South African Law Journal 39 (1975).

Civil law (legal system)

pt:Teoria do abuso de direito